Ołowianka  is an island located east of the city center in Gdańsk, Poland. The island is enclosed by the Motława from the north and west and Stepka Channel from the east. It is one of the two islands located on the Motława, alongside Granary Island.

Islands of Poland
Gdańsk